Opérateur de transport de Wallonie (OTW) (French for: Transport Operator of Wallonia), formerly Société régionale wallonne du transport (SRWT) (French for: Walloon Regional Transport Company), is responsible for the supervision, strategic planning and marketing of a group of five regional public transport directorate branded as TEC or "Transport En Commun" (French for: Public Transport) in Wallonia, Belgium. It is primarily a bus operator, but also operates the Charleroi tram system. TEC buses and trams are distinctively painted yellow and red.

TEC was founded in 1991 through the breakup of the former Belgian NMVB/SNCV into separate companies for Wallonia and Flanders.

TEC sells the MOBIB smartcard branded "TEC it easy" and runs a chain of shops called Espace TEC.

History
In 2019, Société régionale wallonne du Transport (SRWT) became Opérateur de transport de Wallonie (OTW).

TEC directorate
 TEC Walloon Brabant
 TEC Charleroi
 TEC Hainaut
 TEC Liège-Verviers 
 TEC Namur-Luxembourg

See also
De Lijn - public transport company in Flanders
Société des Transports Intercommunaux de Bruxelles STIB-MIVB - public transport company in Brussels
Vicinal tramway - the former SNCV
Charleroi Pre-metro

External links

TEC official website 
Tram Travels: Transport En Commun en Wallonie (TEC) 

Public transport operators
Government-owned companies of Belgium
Organisations based in Wallonia
Public transport in Belgium